Liya Medzhidovna Akhedzhakova (born 9 July 1938) is a Soviet and Russian film, stage and voice actress who received the title of People's Artist of Russia in 1994. She received two Nika Awards as the best supporting actress and the 2014 Nika Honorary Prize.

Biography
Akhedzhakova was born in Dnepropetrovsk (modern-day Dnipro, Ukraine). She grew up in a theatrical family in Maykop. Her father, Medzhid Salehovich Akhedzhakov (1914–2012), was a Circassian nobleman who served as the Principal Director of the National Theatre of the Republic of Adygea. Her mother, Yuliya Alexandrovna Akhedzhakova (1916–1990), was also an actress at the same drama theatre. At the age of 10, when her mother and aunt were suffering from tuberculosis, she wrote a letter to Joseph Stalin with a request for help. In response, a rare drug was delivered to her family.

In 1956 she entered the Moscow Institute of Nonferrous Metals and Gold where she studied for eighteen months. She first appeared on stage in 1961 at Moscow Youth Theatre. In 1962, she graduated from Lunacharsky State Institute for Theatre Arts (GITIS). Her first film appearance was in Ishchu cheloveka (1973) (Russian: Looking for a Man). Her debut in this drama was awarded several prizes at international film festivals in Locarno, Switzerland and Varna, Bulgaria. In 1977 she joined the Sovremennik Theatre. In 1986 she played four main roles in the play Apartment Columbine directed by Roman Viktyuk.

As a film actress Liya Akhedzhakova became widely known due to her roles in Eldar Ryazanov's films, including Tania in The Irony of Fate (1975), Verochka in Office Romance (1977), Malaeva in The Garage (1979), and Fima in Promised Heaven (1991). In the 2000 film Old Hags she played alongside her stepfather.

Personal life
Akhedzhakova's first husband was Valery Nosik, an actor of Moscow Pushkin Drama Theatre and Maly Theatre. Her second husband was artist and poet Boris Kocheishvili. In the summer of 2001, Liya Akhedzhakova married the Moscow-based photographer Vladimir Persiyanov.

Political views
During the 1993 Russian constitutional crisis on the night before the storming of the White House, Akhedzhakova and several other popular actors attended a live broadcast at the "reserve studio" outside of the Ostankino Technical Center. She expressed support to Boris Yeltsin while also criticized the army for "not protecting us" from the old Soviet Constitution and encouraged people "to wake up", or "the Communists will return". Yeltsin watched the broadcast in his office. He later wrote in his memoirs, "I will always remember Akhedhakova – shocked, fragile, but firm and courageous". She was criticized for her speech by Alexander Prokhanov, Alexander Rutskoy, Stanislav Govorukhin and others who blamed intelligentsia for escalating the conflict.

Akhedzhakova is a critic of contemporary Russian politics. She has protested the law that prohibits adoption of Russian children by US citizens, the persecution of Mikhail Khodorkovsky and the incarceration of Vasily Aleksanyan. Together with Eldar Ryazanov, Yuri Shevchuk, Andrey Makarevich, Andrei Konchalovsky and others, she has expressed opposition to Russia's policy toward Ukraine. Following the shootdown of Malaysia Airlines Flight 17, she publicly read a poem by Andrey Orlov, Requiem for MH17, where he apologized as a Russian for the incident. In 2013, Akhedzhakova received a prize from the Moscow Helsinki Group for "the protection of human rights by means of culture and arts". She spoke out in opposition to the 2022 Russian invasion of Ukraine.

According to Eldar Ryazanov, "she sympathizes with the weak, and despises the cruel. In this, her artistic credo coincides with the stance of the great Chaplin".

Honours and selected awards

Selected filmography

Film

Television

References

External links

1938 births
20th-century Russian actresses
21st-century Russian actresses
Living people
Actors from Dnipro
Circassian people of Russia
Academicians of the Russian Academy of Cinema Arts and Sciences "Nika"
Russian Academy of Theatre Arts alumni
Honored Artists of the RSFSR
People's Artists of Russia
Recipients of the Nika Award
Recipients of the Order "For Merit to the Fatherland", 4th class
Recipients of the Order of Honour (Russia)
Recipients of the Vasilyev Brothers State Prize of the RSFSR
Russian activists against the 2022 Russian invasion of Ukraine
Russian film actresses
Russian stage actresses
Russian television actresses
Russian voice actresses
Soviet film actresses
Soviet stage actresses
Soviet television actresses
Soviet voice actresses